Lycée Français de Bali Louis Antoine de Bougainville (LFB), also known as the École Internationale Française de Bali (EIFB) before 2016, is a French international school in Kerobokan, Bali, Indonesia. It serves maternelle (preschool) through the terminale (final year) of the lycée (senior high school).

The school first opened on 1 September 1991. High school classes began in 2009, with terminale (final year) classes starting in 2011.

 the school has about 350 students.

References

External links

Lycée Français de Bali 
Lycée Français de Bali 
 "L’ECOLE DE BALI DEVIENDRA UNE ECOLE D’AMBASSADE A LA FIN DE L’ANNEE" (Archive). La Gazette de Bali. November 2014, Issue # 114.

French international schools in Indonesia
Schools in Bali
1991 establishments in Indonesia
Educational institutions established in 1991